Bakhshan Khan railway station is located in Pakistan.

See also
 List of railway stations in Pakistan
 Pakistan Railways

References

Railway stations in Bahawalnagar District
Railway stations on Samasata–Amruka Branch Line